The men's long jump event at the 1932 Olympic Games took place August 2. Twelve athletes from 9 nations competed. The 1930 Olympic Congress in Berlin had reduced the limit from 4 athletes per NOC to 3 athletes. The event was won by Ed Gordon of the United States, the nation's third consecutive and eighth overall victory in the long jump.

Background

This was the ninth appearance of the event, which is one of 12 athletics events to have been held at every Summer Olympics. The returning finalists from the 1928 Games were silver medalist Silvio Cator of Haiti and fifth-place finisher Erich Köchermann of Germany. Chuhei Nambu of Japan had broken the world record in 1931. Home nation favorites were Dick Barber (Olympic trials winner) and Ed Gordon (AAU champion).

Argentina and Brazil each made their first appearance in the event. The United States appeared for the ninth time, the only nation to have long jumpers at each of the Games thus far.

Competition format

With a small field, the 1932 competition used a single round. All jumpers had six jumps.

Records

These were the standing world and Olympic records (in metres) prior to the 1928 Summer Olympics.

(*) Robert LeGendre set the Olympic record in the 1924 pentathlon contest

Schedule

Results

References

Men's long jump
Long jump at the Olympics
Men's events at the 1932 Summer Olympics